Swept is the third album by English singer-songwriter Julia Fordham, released in late 1991. It includes Fordham's biggest UK hit single, "(Love Moves in) Mysterious Ways".

Background
"I Thought It Was You" was released as the first single from the album in August 1991, reaching number 64 in the UK Singles Chart. After the album's initial release in the UK and in Japan, Fordham was invited to record "(Love Moves in) Mysterious Ways" for the film The Butcher's Wife. Swept was swiftly released internationally with "Mysterious Ways" included, coinciding with the US release of the film. While the movie flopped, "Mysterious Ways" became Fordham's biggest hit single in the UK, reaching number 19 in 1992. "I Thought It Was You" was then re-released in a new mix. This version peaked at number 45.

Track listing
All tracks written by Julia Fordham, except where noted.

Personnel
Adapted from AllMusic.

Musicians

Julia Fordham – primary artist, vocals
Andy Barron – drums
Miles Bould – percussion
Robbie Buchanan – keyboards
Valerie Carter – background vocals
Vinnie Colaiuta – drums
Michael Fisher	– percussion
Angie Giles – vocals
Isobel Griffiths – drums
Graham Henderson – accordion
Christopher Hooker – oboe
Manu Katché – drums
Larry Klein – bass
Dave Lewis – saxophone
Jeremy Lubbock – arranger
John Lubbock – conductor
Dónal Lunny – bodhrán, bouzouki
Kate Markowitz – background vocals
Martin McCarrick – cello
Dominic Miller – arranger, guitar
Grant Mitchell	– arranger, keyboards
Pino Palladino – bass
Dean Parks – guitar
Dashiell Rae – vocals
David Rhodes – guitar
Frank Ricotti – vibraphone
David Sancious – keyboards
Alan Thomson – bass
Gavyn Wright – violin

Production
Julia Fordham – producer
Peter Asher – producer
Richard Arnold	– assistant engineer
Richard Bull – producer, programming
Giles Cowley – assistant engineer
Graham Dickson	– engineer, mixing
Filippo Gabbrielli – assistant engineer
Kate Garner – photography
Matt Howe – assistant engineer
Pete Lewis – assistant engineer
Dominic Miller – producer
Grant Mitchell	– producer, programming
Simon Osborne – engineer
Hugh Padgham – engineer, mixing, producer
Jeremy Wheatley – assistant engineer
Frank Wolf – engineer, mixing

Charts

Weekly Charts

References

External links
Swept at Discogs

1991 albums
Virgin Records albums
Julia Fordham albums
Albums produced by Hugh Padgham
Albums produced by Peter Asher